Tonelagee at , is the 25th–highest peak in Ireland on the Arderin scale, and the 33rd–highest peak on the Vandeleur-Lynam scale.  Tonelagee is situated in the central sector of the Wicklow Mountains range, and sits on the main "central spine" of the range that runs from Kippure in the north, to Lugnaquillia in the south; and in particular, the continuous "central boggy ridge" that runs from the Sally Gap in the north, via Mullaghcleevaun, to Tonelagee. Tonelagee is the third highest peak in Wicklow after Lugnaquilla and Mullaghcleevaun.

To the north is the subsidiary summit of Stoney Top , and to the east is another subsidiary summit of Tonelagee NE Top ; between these three summits is the deep "heart-shaped" corrie lake of Lough Ouler.

Naming
Irish academic Paul Tempan, notes Tonelagee is sometimes spelled Tonelegee and its Irish name of Tóin le Gaoith appears in several Irish placenames, such as Tandragee in Antrim, however, it was not clear what they had in common regarding the wind. In addition, Tempan found no particular evidence of any other Irish language names behind Stoney Top except to note that there was a cross-inscribed standing stone between Stoney Top and the summit of Tonelagee.

Geography 
Tonelagee is the third highest peak in the Wicklow Mountains, and is situated in southern-end of the central section of the range. Tonelagee sits on the main "central spine" of the whole Wicklow Mountains range that runs from Kippure in the north, to Lugnaquillia in the south, and in particular, Tonelagee is the southern terminus of the  continuous "central boggy ridge" that runs from the Sally Gap in the north, via Mullaghcleevaun, to Tonelagee.

Tonelagee's main "boggy massif" includes the northern subsidiary summit of Stoney Top , which has a prominence of  that qualifies it as Vandeleur-Lynam; while its second major eastern subsidiary summit of Tonelagee NE Top , has a prominence of  also qualifying it as Vandeleur-Lynam.

Tonelagee's massif includes a long south-easterly spur with the summits of (in order of proximity): Tonlagee South-East Top , Brockagh Mountain North-West Top , Brockagh Mountain , and Brockagh Mountain SE Top .

Hill walking 
A common route to the summit of Tonelagee is from the east via an 8-kilometre 3-4 hour "loop walk" which starts from a large car-park just above Glenmacnass Waterfall just off the R115 road (also called the Old Military Road). The route crosses the Glenmacnass River to reach Tonelagee's north-east corrie and Lough Ouler, from where it then summits via the northern edge of the corrie rim to the summit of Tonelagee (passing the mica-shist "standing stone" along the way); the descent is via Tonelagee NE Top and then directly down to the shoulder to the Glenmacnass Waterfall car park.

A shorter even more direct route is from the Wicklow Gap on the R756 road to the west, climbing the 6-kilometre 2-3 hour route directly up the shoulder of Tonelagee and then retracing back to the car; this route is rarely offered in guidebooks as it leaves out Lough Ouler and Tonelagee's subsidiary summits.

Bibliography

Gallery

See also

Wicklow Way
Wicklow Round
Wicklow Mountains
Lists of mountains in Ireland
List of mountains of the British Isles by height
List of Marilyns in the British Isles
List of Hewitt mountains in England, Wales and Ireland

References

External links
MountainViews: The Irish Mountain Website, Tonelagee
MountainViews: Irish Online Mountain Database
The Database of British and Irish Hills , the largest database of British Isles mountains ("DoBIH")
Hill Bagging UK & Ireland, the searchable interface for the DoBIH
Hiking Lough Ouler, guide and itinerary. 

Marilyns of Ireland
Mountains and hills of County Wicklow
Hewitts of Ireland
Mountains under 1000 metres